W. Wood (full name and dates of birth and death unknown) was an English cricketer.  Wood's batting and bowling styles are unknown.  As a batsman, he occupied the final batting position at number eleven.

Wood made two first-class appearances for Surrey in 1883, against Nottinghamshire at Trent Bridge and Derbyshire at the County Ground, Derby.  Against Nottinghamshire, Surrey were dismissed for 87 in their first-innings, with Wood being dismissed for a duck by Edwin Mills.  In response, Nottinghamshire made 188, with Wood taking the wicket of Alfred Shaw to finish the innings with figures of 1/22 from 11 overs.  Wood was dismissed for a duck by Shaw in Surrey's second-innings total of 43, which gave Nottinghamshire victory by an innings and 58 runs.  Against Derbyshire, Surrey responded to Derbyshire's first-innings total of 88 by making 129, with Wood scoring a single run before he was dismissed by John Richardson.  Derbyshire made 226 in their second-innings, with Wood bowling 16 wicketless overs.  Surrey were set a victory target of 186, but could only manage to make 126, with Wood scoring 8 runs before he was dismissed by James Brelsford.  His was the final wicket to fall.

References

External links
W. Wood at ESPNcricinfo
W. Wood at CricketArchive

English cricketers
Surrey cricketers